|}

The Racing Post Novice Chase is a Grade 1 National Hunt chase in Ireland. The race is run at Leopardstown Racecourse in December, over a distance of 2 miles and 1 furlong (3,419 metres) and during its running there are 11 fences to be jumped.

The race is run on 26 December, which is known in Ireland as St Stephen's Day, and is one of the feature races of the course's four-day Christmas Festival.

Prior to 2011 it was titled the Bord Na Mona With Nature Novice Chase. Prior to 2009 it was titled the Durkan New Homes Novice Chase. During the 1990s the race was known as the Dennys Gold Medal Novice Chase.

Records
Leading jockey (3 wins):
 Paul Townend -   Blackstairmountain (2011), Arvika Ligeonniere (2012), Ferny Hollow (2021) 

Leading trainer (9 wins):
 Willie Mullins –  Missed That (2005), Blackstairmountain (2011), Arvika Ligeonniere (2012), Douvan (2015), Min (2016), Footpad (2017), Franco De Port (2020), Ferny Hollow (2021), Saint Roi (2022)

Winners since 1987

See also
 Horse racing in Ireland
 List of Irish National Hunt races

References

Racing Post:

National Hunt races in Ireland
National Hunt chases
Leopardstown Racecourse